Derrimut is a suburb in Melbourne, Victoria, Australia,  west of Melbourne's Central Business District, located within the City of Brimbank Local government area. Derrimut recorded a population of 8,651 at the 2021 census.

Located on the lands of the Wurundjeri Woiwurrung people, of the Kulin Nation, Derrimut is bounded by Foleys Road to the north, Robinsons Road to the west, the Western Ring Road to the east and Boundary Road to the south.

Derrimut is a newly developed suburb in Melbourne. It is named after Derrimut, a nineteenth-century Aboriginal Elder. Derrimut Post Office opened on 1 June 1866 in the rural area, but closed in 1918.

The area was home to the "Mount Derrimut" field station of the University of Melbourne from 1964 to 1996 . It focused on agriculture. The site was also used by the Victoria University Western Institute to deliver courses in the late 1980s and early 1990s where students from all around Melbourne come together to study their Business Degrees, some of these students groups still remain close friends until this day. Before being used by the university, it was used by ICI (now Orica) for training and conference purposes. The site is now occupied by the Sunshine Golf Club; the course opened in November 2007.

See also
 City of Sunshine – Derrimut was previously within this former local government area. 
 Electoral district of Derrimut

References

Suburbs of Melbourne
Suburbs of the City of Brimbank